Paralpenus flavizonatus is a moth of the family Erebidae. It was described by George Hampson in 1911. It is found in Ghana and Nigeria.

The larvae feed on Gossypium species.

References

Spilosomina
Moths described in 1911